Hasan-e Kamali (also Romanized as Ḩasan-e Kamālī; also known as Ḩajiḩasan-e Kamālī) is a village in Sigar Rural District, in the Central District of Lamerd County, Fars Province, Iran. At the 2006 census, its population was 308, in 75 families.

References 

Populated places in Lamerd County